Nicholas Wiggins (born February 8, 1984), also known by the stage name Zombie Nicholas, is an American rock musician.  He is best known for his time as the bassist and backing vocalist for the horror punk band Aiden from 2003 until 2015.  He is also a member of the supergroup Me Vs. Myself with Carson Allen of On the Last Day and played bass for William Control's live band from 2008 to 2012.  Most recently, he has been the rhythm guitarist of the hard rock band Girl On Fire, who released their debut album Not Broken in 2013.  He lives in Seattle, Washington.

Discography

Aiden
Our Gangs Dark Oath (2004)
Nightmare Anatomy (2005)
Conviction (2007)
Knives (2009)
From Hell With Love: Luciforever (2010)
Disguises (2011)

EPs
A Split of Nightmares - Split EP with Stalin's War (2004)
Rain in Hell (2006)

William Control
Hate Culture (October 28, 2008)
 Noir (June 8, 2010)

Me Vs Myself
Seasons EP (2010) 
Where I Am... Where I Want To Be

Equipment 
Nick uses:

Gretsch Guitars 
Gibson Guitars
Marshall JMP Head
Marshall Cabs
Fender P-Bass
Fender Jazz Bass
Ernie Ball Music Man Bass
Ampeg Classic Head
Ampeg 8x10 Bass Cab

References

External links
Endorsement
Nick Wiggins biography

1984 births
Living people
Musicians from Seattle
Horror punk musicians
Guitarists from Washington (state)
21st-century American bass guitarists